FCPA may refer to:

 Fairfax County Park Authority 
 Fellow of the Society of Certified Practicing Accountants
 Foreign Corrupt Practices Act
 Makabana Airport, in the Republic of the Congo, which has that ICAO airport code